Siguranța was the generic name for the successive secret police services in the Kingdom of Romania. The official title of the organization changed throughout its history, with names including Directorate of the Police and General Safety, the Secret Intelligence Service, the Special Intelligence Service or simply the Intelligence Service,

History
Created in 1908, in the aftermath of a major peasant revolt, it acted as a political police, supervising, infiltrating and trying to dismantle political groupings considered undesirable by the Romanian governments. Changing its structure several times during the first half of the 20th century, it was ultimately disbanded in 1948, when Romania became a people's republic. Siguranța's role, as well as a large part of its employees, were integrated into the newly founded Department of State Security ("Securitate").

Around 1924, Siguranța secret intelligence assassinated a leader of the militant wing of the Romanian Communist Party. The victim was also the brother of dedicated Communist Elizaveta Zarubina, soon to become one of the USSR's most crucial agents. A secret policeman came to her apartment in Bucharest later the same year to arrest her; he was subsequently shot by Zarubina, attracting the attention of top Soviet intelligence officials.

References

1908 in Romania
20th century in Romania
Defunct Romanian intelligence agencies
Law enforcement agencies of Romania
Secret police
Kingdom of Romania

ro:Siguranță